Aimal is a given name originating in Pashto meaning friend. Notable people with the name include:
Dr.Sayed Aimal Hashimi, Afghan doctor and social worker
Aimal Faizi, Afghan journalist and columnist
Aimal Wali Khan, Pakistani nationalist politician
Mir Aimal Kansi, Pakistani convicted shooter

References